Sister Christine Vladimiroff, OSB (January 12, 1940 – September 25, 2014) was the prioress of the Benedictine Sisters of Erie from 1998 to 2010. As of 2004 she was also President of the Leadership Conference of Women Religious, USA.

In 2001, she declined a request from the Vatican to prohibit Sister Joan Chittister from attending a dissident women's ordination conference in Dublin, Ireland.

On February 21, 2007, the Erie City Council issued special proclamations recognizing women religious, including Vladimiroff, in three Erie area communities, for making a difference in Erie through their respective ministries.

References

External links
Presidential Address
Women's News

1940 births
2014 deaths
Benedictine nuns
People from Erie, Pennsylvania
20th-century American Roman Catholic nuns
Catholics from Pennsylvania
21st-century American Roman Catholic nuns